The 2020–21 Eastern Michigan Eagles men's basketball team represented Eastern Michigan University during the 2020–21 NCAA Division I men's basketball season. The Eagles, led by 10th-year head coach Rob Murphy, played their home games at the Convocation Center in Ypsilanti, Michigan as members of the Mid-American Conference. Starting this season, the MAC announced the removal of divisions. They finished the season 6–12, 3–11 in MAC play to finish in 10th place. They failed to qualify for the MAC tournament. 

Following the season, the school announced it as parting ways with Murphy after 10 seasons. On April 12, 2021, the school hired EMU alum and former Kent State, Arkansas, and South Florida head coach Stan Heath as the team's new head coach.

Previous season
The Eagles finished the 2019–20 NCAA Division I men's basketball season 16–16, 6–12 in MAC play to finish in a tie for last place in the West Division. They lost in the first round of the MAC tournament to Kent State.

Roster

Schedule and results

|-
!colspan=9 style=| Regular season

Source

References

Eastern Michigan Eagles men's basketball seasons
Eastern Michigan
Eastern Michigan Eagles men's basketball
Eastern Michigan Eagles men's basketball